Plomodiern is a commune in the Finistère department of Brittany in north-western France.

Geography

Climate
Plomodiern has a oceanic climate (Köppen climate classification Cfb).

Population
Inhabitants of Plomodiern are called in French Plomodiernois. The village is located next to the Menez Hom.

Politics

Mayors

Municipal election results
2020:
Plomodiern ensemble 58.66%
Un nouveau souffle pour plomodiern 41.34%.

See also
Communes of the Finistère department
Plomodiern Parish close

References

External links
Official website 

Mayors of Finistère Association 

Communes of Finistère